Andrea Arsović (born 5 February 1987) is a Serbian sport shooter. She won a gold medal in the 10m air rifle at the 2015 European Games and is also a two-time European champion in the same discipline as well as a three-time champion in mixed team and once in women's team. Arsović won a gold medal at the 2009 and 2018 Mediterranean Games. She competed in the Women's 10 metre air rifle and women's 50 metre three positions events at the 2012 Summer Olympics.

At the 2014 World Championship she won a bronze medal in team competition and finished in 5th place in 10m air rifle, securing a first quota for Serbia for the 2016 Summer Olympics.

References

External links
 

1987 births
Living people
Serbian female sport shooters
Olympic shooters of Serbia
Shooters at the 2012 Summer Olympics
Shooters at the 2016 Summer Olympics
Shooters at the 2020 Summer Olympics
People from Drvar
Shooters at the 2015 European Games
European Games gold medalists for Serbia
European Games medalists in shooting
European champions for Serbia
Mediterranean Games gold medalists for Serbia
Mediterranean Games bronze medalists for Serbia
Competitors at the 2009 Mediterranean Games
Competitors at the 2013 Mediterranean Games
Mediterranean Games medalists in shooting
Shooters at the 2019 European Games
Competitors at the 2022 Mediterranean Games